Francesco Antonio Baldassare Uttini (1723 Bologna – 25 October 1795) was an Italian composer and conductor who was active mostly in Sweden.

He is best remembered today as a composer of operas in both the Italian and Swedish languages and for his five symphonies. He provided the music for the first Swedish grand opera, Thetis och Pelée, which was commissioned by Gustavus III in 1772 and was successfully performed the following year.

He was married first to the opera singer Rosa Scarlatti, and then to the opera singer Sofia Liljegren. He was the father of the ballet dancer Carlo and double bass player Adolpho Ludovico Uttini.

Works 
1743: Alessandro nelle Indie , opera seria, Genoa
1748: Astianatte, dramma seria, Cesena
1750: Demofoonte, opera seria, Ferrara
1752: Siroe,  opera seria, Hamburg
1753: L'olimpiade, opera seria, Copenhagen
1754: Zenobia, opera seria, Copenhagen
1755: La Galatea, opera seria, Drottningholm 
1755: L'isola disabitata, dramma per musica, Drottningholm
1755: Il rè pastore, dramma per musica, Drottningholm
1757: L'eroe cinese, opera seria, Drottningholm
1757: Adriano in Siria, opera seria, Drottningholm
1762: Cythère assiégée, opéra comique, Stockholm
1764: Il sogno di Scipione, dramatic serenade, Stockholm
1765: Soliman II, ou Les trois sultanes, opéra comique, Stockholm
1766: Le gui de chène, opéra comique, Stockholm
1766: Psyché, tragédie lyrique, Drottningholm
1768: L'aveugle de Palmyre, opéra comique, Drottningholm
1773: Thetis och Pelée, grand opera, Stockholm
1774: Aeglé, opéra-ballet, Stockholm
1774: Birger Jarl och Mechtilde, drama with divertissements, Stockholm
1776: Aline, drottning uti Golconda, opera, Stockholm

Sources
Bertil H. van Boer, Martin Tegen. The New Grove Dictionary of Opera, edited by Stanley Sadie (1992),   and 

1723 births
1795 deaths
Italian male classical composers
Italian opera composers
Male opera composers
Italian expatriates in Sweden
Musicians from Bologna
18th-century Italian composers
18th-century Italian male musicians